Henri Médus (21 October 1904 – 11 November 1985) was a French operatic bass.

A member of the troupe of the Opéra Garnier from 1933, he distinguished himself particularly in the roles of : The Magic Flute (Sarastro), Samson et Dalila (the old Hebrew man), Aida (Ramfis), Rigoletto (Sparafucile), La Juive (Cardinal de Brogni), Les Huguenots (Marcel), Die Entführung aus dem Serail (Osmin), Boris Godunov (Pimen, Varlaam), Die Walküre (Hunding), and Der Rosenkavalier (Baron Ochs).

Biography 
Medus was born in Guelma (Algeria) where he spent his childhood before his family settled in Algiers. He took singing lessons from Rose Elsie (soprano of the Opéra-Comique)  After an audition for conductor Désiré-Émile Inghelbrecht (1880–1965), then musical director of the Algiers Opera, he was hired for the role of Colline in La Bohème. He made his stage debut on October 16, 1929, in Puccini's opera in French. After two seasons of experience in a multitude of roles, he moved to Paris and was hired as a chorister at the Théâtre du Châtelet. He studied further with Pierre-Ernest Dupré.

In 1933 he joined the Opéra Garnier and made his debut there on November 25, 1933, as Ramfis in Aida. He made his debut at the Théâtre de l'Opéra-Comique on April 20, 1941, as Arkel in Pelléas et Mélisande.He performed extensively in French and other European opera houses.

In 1939, he appeared in the film The End of the Day directed by Julien Duvivier. He appeared in world premieres in works by Reynaldo Hahn, Max d'Ollone, Henri Rabaud, and Gilbert Bécaud.

In 1959, he left the Opéra Garnier troupe while continuing his career other French theatres. He taught at the Conservatoire de Paris

In 1974, he gave his farewell performance  in the role of Sarastro in The Magic Flute, which he had performed frequently throughout his long operatic career. He continued to be a member of juries for singing competitions.

He died in Toulon and is buried in Lagoubran Cemetery.

Discography 

 Complete
 Gilbert Bécaud's  (the priest), with Alvino Misciano, Rosanna Carteri, Agnès Disney, Michel Llado, Louis Maurin, Peter Gottlieb, Roger Soyer, Franck Schooten, Georges Prêtre (dir.)- Pathé ASTY 136-138 3 (33 rpm)
 Berlioz'sL'Enfance du Christ (le père de famille), with Hélène Bouvier, Jean Giraudeau, Louis Noguéra, Michel Roux, André Cluytens (dir.) – juin 1951 – DTX 101-102
 Bizet's Carmen (Zuniga), with Suzanne Juyol, Libero de Luca, Julien Giovannetti, Jacqueline Cauchard, Denise Boursin, Marcel Enot, Jean Vieuille, Albert Wolff (dir.)
 Saint-Saëns's Samson et Dalila (The Hebrew old man), with José Luccioni, Hélène Bouvier, Paul Cabanel, Charles Cambon, Louis Fourestier (dir.) – 1946 – EMI 5 65263 2 / rééd. Naxos historical 8.110063-64 (2 CD)
 Emmanuel Bondeville's The School for Husbands (un clerc de nuit) with Mado Robin, Agnès Disney, Louis Musy, Jean Giraudeau, Xavier Depraz, Robert Massard, Serge Rallier, Pierre Giannotti, André Philippe. Albert Wolff conducting – DECCA FAT 133518 – Grand prix du disque 1954
 Weber's Oberon (le calife), with Constantina Araujo, Rita Gorr, Denise Duval, Martha Angelici, Georges Noré, Raphaël Romagnoni, Pierre Germain, Charles Paul, Marcel Clavere, Edmond Chastenet, Paul Finel, Max Conti, Alain Vanzo, André Philippe, Jacqueline Cauchard, André Cluytens – Live Opéra Garnier – Malibran – 1955

 Extracts, selections
 Adam's Si j'étais roi (Prince Kadoor), with René Bianco, Liliane Berton, Andrée Gabriel, André Mallabrera, Bernard Alvy, Richard Blareau (dir.) – Musidisc 203002 / reissue Accord 4762104 (2 CDs)
 Lecocq's La Fille de madame Angot (Louchard), with Colette Riedinger, Suzanne Lafaye, Georgette Spanellys, Gabriel Bacquier, Louis Musy, Michel Cadiou, Richard Blareau (dir.) – January 1963 – Decca
 Meyerbeer's Les Huguenots (Urbain), with Renée Doria, Jeanne Rinella, Guy Fouché, Simone Couderc, Adrien Legros, Jean Allain (dir.) – Pléiade P3085/86 (33 rpm) / reissue. Malibran Music MR 581 – Recorded in 1953 at Théâtre de l'Apollo.
 Les Basses françaises, vol. 2 – Malibran Music MR 651

Filmography 
 La Fin du jour by Julien Duvivier (1939) with Louis Jouvet, Victor Francen, Gabrielle Dorziat, Sylvie, Michel Simon, Madeleine Ozeray, Odette Talazac, François Périer, Jean Coquelin. Music by Maurice Jaubert

Bibliography and sources 

 Stéphane Wolff, Un demi-siècle d'Opéra-Comique (1900–1950), éd. André Bonne, Paris, 1953
 Revue Le Guide du concert et du disque, years 1959–1960
 Revue L'Entracte, years 1960–1963
 Stéphane Wolff, L'Opéra au Palais Garnier (1875–1962), L'Entracte, Paris, 1962 – Reprint series Ressources, Champion-Slatkine, Geneva, 1983 
 Étienne Ducarme et Jean Gabriel, Vingt deux années d'art lyrique à Saint-Étienne (1964–1986), Imprilux, Saint-Étienne, 1987
 Jean-Philippe Mousnier, Albert Wolff – Eugène Bigot, series Univers musical, L'Harmattan, Paris, 2001 
 Georges Farret, Alain Vanzo, le Werther du palais Garnier, series Temps Mémoire, éditions Autres Temps, Paris, 2007 
 Erik Baeck, André Cluytens, itinéraire d'un chef d'orchestre, Mardaga, Wavre, 2009 
 Musée de l'Opéra de Vichy

References

External links 
 Discography on Discogs
 Extraits audios sur YouTube: La Juive « Air du Cardinal de Brogni », L'Enlèvement au sérail Concert RTF 16 June 1959 "Air d'Osmin, Les Huguenots Air de Marcel

1904 births
1985 deaths
People from Guelma
French music educators
Operatic basses
French basses
20th-century French male opera singers